Highland High School is a public high school located in the town of Highland in Lake County, Indiana. It is part of the School Town of Highland and serves as the only high school in the district. The school was founded in 1957 and incorporated in 1960.

Demographics
The demographic breakdown of the 1,118 students enrolled in 2014-2015 was:
Male - 51.6%
Female - 48.4%
Native American/Alaskan - 0.2%
Asian/Pacific islanders - 1.2%
Black - 5.4%
Hispanic - 26.3%
White - 64.8%
Multiracial - 2.1%

30.6% of the students were eligible for free or reduced lunch.

Athletics
The following sports are offered Highland High School:

Baseball (boys)
Basketball (boys & girls)
Bowling (boys & girls)
 Cheerleading (girls)
Cross Country (boys & girls)
 Dance (girls)
Football (boys)
Golf (boys & girls)
Soccer (boys & girls)
Softball (girls)
Swimming (sport) (boys & girls)
Tennis (boys & girls)
Track and Field (boys & girls)
Volleyball (girls)
Wrestling (boys)

Clubs and Extracurriculars 
The following clubs and organizations are available for students at Highland High School:

 Chess Club
 Speech & Debate Team
 Diversity University
 Science Olympiad
 Japanese Olympiad
 Highland Theater Company (HTC)
 Spanish Club (Spanish Honors Society)
 German Club (German Honors Society)
 Japanese Club 
 Key Club
 Sustainability Club
 Robotics
 Yearbook Staff
 Marching/Jazz/Pep Band

Notable alumni
 Ward Cunningham, programmer and inventor of the wiki, who started programming at Highland High School
 Ryan Grigson, executive with NFL's Cleveland Browns, former general manager of Indianapolis Colts
 Tom Homco, former NFL player, Los Angeles Rams
 Rick Karr, journalist and educator
 Debra A. Kemp, author
 Kevin Manno, television and radio host
 Biscuit Miller, blues musician
 Georgette Mosbacher, businesswoman, political activist
 Debbie Patton, professional bodybuilder
 Dan Stevenson, politician
 Eric Justin Toth, replaced Osama bin Laden on FBI Ten Most Wanted Fugitives list, attended Southridge Elementary and Highland High schools before graduating from Indiana Academy for Science, Mathematics and Humanities in 2000
 Jim Umpleby, businessman, CEO of Caterpillar Inc.
 Cornelius Van Til, Christian philosopher, Reformed theologian, and presuppositional apologist

See also
 List of high schools in Indiana

References

External links
 Highland High School website
 School Town of Highland website

Public high schools in Indiana
Schools in Lake County, Indiana
1957 establishments in Indiana